Lega promotrice degli interessi femminili ('League for the Promotion of the Interests of Women') was an Italian organization for women's rights, founded in 1880. It was the first organization for women's right in Italy.    

It was founded by Anna Maria Mozzoni in Milan in 1880.

References

Organizations established in 1880
1880 establishments in Italy
Women's rights organizations
Women's organisations based in Italy
Women's suffrage in Italy